Krasnoarmeysk is the name of several urban localities in Russia:
Krasnoarmeysk, Moscow Oblast, a town in Moscow Oblast, administratively incorporated as a town under oblast jurisdiction
Krasnoarmeysk, Saratov Oblast, a town in Saratov Oblast, administratively incorporated as a town under oblast jurisdiction